Gildehouse is an unincorporated community in Franklin County, in the U.S. state of Missouri.

History
A post office called Gildehouse was established in 1894, and remained in operation until 1906. The community has the name of Henry Gildehaus.

References

Unincorporated communities in Franklin County, Missouri
Unincorporated communities in Missouri